Affinity may refer to:

Commerce, finance and law 
 Affinity (law), kinship by marriage
 Affinity analysis, a market research and business management technique 
 Affinity Credit Union, a Saskatchewan-based credit union
 Affinity Equity Partners, an Asian private equity firm
 Affinity fraud, a type of scam targeting a specific demographic
 Affinity marketing, a method of extending market reach by forming partnerships and cross-selling relationships

Religion and belief 
 Affinity (canon law), a kinship arising from the sexual intercourse of a man and a woman
 Affinity (Christian organisation), network of conservative evangelical churches and Christian agencies
 Affinity group, a private, non-commercial and non-governmental organisation formed around a shared interest or goal

Science and technology 
 Affinity, the UK's first road-legal solar car, built by Cambridge University Eco Racing
 Affinity (mathematics), an affine transformation preserving collinearity
 Affinity (pharmacology), a characterisation of protein-ligand binding strength
 Affinity (sociology), a shared interest and commitment between persons in groups and/or willingness to associate
 Affinity (taxonomy), a suggestion of common descent or type
 Affinity chromatography, method of separating a biomolecule from a mixture
 Affinity electrophoresis, general name for many analytical methods used in biochemistry and biotechnology
 Affinity laws, laws used in hydraulics to express relationships between variables involved in fan or pump performance
 Binding affinity, a measure of the interaction of ligands with their binding sites
 Chemical affinity, used to describe or characterise elements' or compounds' readiness to form bonds
 Electron affinity, energy released on formation of anions
 Processor affinity, a computing term for the assignment of a task to a given core of a multicore CPU
 Serif Europe's Affinity series of programs
 Affinity Designer, a vector illustration editor
 Affinity Photo, a raster graphics editor
 Affinity Publisher, a desktop publishing application

Media-related

Music
 Affinity (band), a jazz/rock band
 Affinity (Affinity album)
 Affinity (Bill Evans album)
 Affinity (Haken album)
 Affinity (Oscar Peterson album)
 Affinity (EP), a 2013 EP by the English band Press to Meco
 Johnny Alegre A, a jazz collective based in Manila

Other media
 Affinity (novel), a 1999 novel by Sarah Waters
 Affinity (film), a 2008 feature film based on the novel

 "Affinity" (Stargate SG-1), an episode from season 8 of the TV sci-fi spin-off series Stargate SG-1
 Elective Affinities, a novel by Goethe

Other uses
 Affinity (medieval), late medieval retainers of a monarch in "bastard feudalism"
 Affinity, West Virginia

See also 
 Affine (disambiguation)
 Affine transformation, a type of transformation applied to a geometry
 Refining, also known as "affining"
 Afinidad (disambiguation)